The Chatouilleuses were a group of Mahoran women who used tickle torture on Comorian political leaders in order to make them accept tightened relations between Mayotte and France.

Notable members 
 Zéna M’Déré
 Zakia Madi
 Echati Maoulida
 Zaïna Méresse

External links
 « Mayotte: "Nous voulons être comme la Lozère" », Georges Michèle, L'Express, 21.
 « Aux Chatouilleuses, la France reconnaissante », Michel Rouger, Ouest France, 6.

Bibliography
 Zakia Madi: la chatouilleuse, Alain-Kamal Martial, Éditions L'Harmattan, 2005 – .

History of Mayotte
Politics of Mayotte
Mahoran culture
Tickling